This is a list of the bird species recorded in Palestine.
The avifauna of the Palestine region is unusually rich for so small an area. Of those, 271 are Palearctic, 40 are Ethiopian (10 of which are also Indian), 7 Indian and 30 which are peculiar to Syria.

Orders containing the largest numbers of species are: Passeriformes (songbirds) with 192 species, Charadriiformes (waders, plovers, gulls) with 88 species, Falconiformes (diurnal birds of prey) with 44 species and Anseriformes (swans, geese, ducks) with 33 species. The largest families are: Sylviidae (warblers) with 43 species, Turdidae (thrushes, chats) and Anatidae (swans, geese, ducks), both with 33 species and Accipitridae (eagles, vultures, hawks) with 32 species. The most populous genera are: Sylvia (warblers) with 15 species, Emberiza (buntings) with 14 and Larus (gulls) with 13, while Oenanthe (wheatears), Sterna (terns) and Falco (falcons) each comprise 11 species.

The types of avifauna are not equally diffused over the whole area. The Palearctic species are found largely near the coast of the Mediterranean Sea and the highlands east and west of Jordan. The Ethiopian and Indian types are almost exclusively confined to the Dead Sea basin. There are 30 species of migratory soaring birds that pass through Palestine annually.

Ostriches
Order: StruthioniformesFamily:Struthionidae
 Common ostrich, Struthio camelus extirpated
 Arabian ostrich, Struthio camelus syriacus extinct

Buzzards, eagles, harriers, hawks, kites and vultures

Order: FalconiformesFamily: Accipitridae
 Egyptian vulture (Neophron percnopterus)
 Cinereous vulture/Eurasian black vulture (Aegypius monachus)
 Bearded vulture (Gypaetus barbatus) extirpated
 Eurasian griffon vulture (Gyps fulvus)
 White-backed vulture (Gyps africanus) (vagrant in occupied Palestine)
 Lappet-faced vulture (Torgos tracheliotos)
 Short-toed eagle (Circaetus gallicus)
 Eastern marsh harrier (Circus spilonotus)
 Hen harrier (Circus cyaneus)
 Pallid harrier (Circus macrourus)
 Montague's harrier (Circus pygargus)
 Eurasian sparrowhawk (Accipiter nisus)
 Levant sparrowhawk (Accipiter brevipes)
 Northern goshawk (Accipiter gentilis)
 Common buzzard (Buteo buteo)
 Long-legged buzzard (Buteo rufinus)
 Steppe buzzard (Buteo buteo)
 European honey buzzard (Pernis apivorus)
 Oriental honey buzzard/crested honey buzzard (Pernis ptilorhyncus)
 Greater spotted eagle (Clanga clanga)
 Lesser spotted eagle (Clanga pomarina)
 Steppe eagle (Aquila nipalensis)
 Eastern imperial eagle (Aquila heliaca)
 Golden eagle (Aquila chrysaetos)
 Booted eagle (Hieraaetus pennatus)
 Bonelli's eagle (Aquila fasciata)
 Black kite (Milvus migrans)
 Red kite (Milvus milvus)

Cranes
Order: GruiformesFamily: Gruidae

 Common crane (Grus grus)

Rails, crakes, gallinules and coots
Order: GruiformesFamily: Rallidae

Rallidae is a large family of small to medium-sized birds which includes the rails, crakes, coots and gallinules. Typically they inhabit dense vegetation in damp environments near lakes, swamps or rivers. In general they are shy and secretive birds, making them difficult to observe. Most species have strong legs and long toes which are well adapted to soft uneven surfaces. They tend to have short, rounded wings and appear to be weak fliers. There are 143 species worldwide.

 Spotted crake (Porzana porzana)
 Little crake (Porzana parva)
 Corn crake (Crex crex)
 Moorhen (Gallinula chloropus)
 Coot (Fulica atra)

Bustards
Order: GruiformesFamily: Otidae

 Little bustard (Tetrax tetrax)
 MacQueen's bustard, (Chlamydotis macqueenii)

Cormorants
Order: PelecaniformesFamily: Phalacrocoracidae

Pelicans
Order: PelecaniformesFamily: Pelecanidae
 Great white pelican (Pelecanus onocrotalus)
 Pink-backed pelican (Pelecanus rufescens)

Falcons
Order: FalconiformesFamily: Falconidae

 Lesser kestrel (Falco naumanni)
 Sooty falcon (Falco concolor)
 Barbary falcon (Falco pelegrinoides)
 Eleonora's falcon (Falco eleonorae)
 Lanner falcon (Falco biarmicus)
 Peregrine falcon (Falco peregrinus)
 Red-footed falcon (Falco vespertinus)
 Saker falcon (Falco cherrug)
 Common kestrel (Falco tinnunculus)
 Hobby (Falco subbuteo)
 Merlin (Falco columbarius)

Osprey
Order: FalconiformesFamily: Pandionidae
 Osprey (Pandion haliaetus)

Quails and partridges
Order: GalliformesFamily: Phasianidae

The Phasianidae are a family of terrestrial birds which consists of quails, partridges, snowcocks, francolins, spurfowls, tragopans, monals, pheasants, peafowls and jungle fowls. In general, they are plump (although they vary in size) and have broad, relatively short wings. There are 156 species worldwide.

 Chukar (Alectoris chukar)
 Sand partridge (Ammoperdix heyi)
 Quail (Coturnix coturnix)

Bittern, herons and egrets
Order: CiconiiformesFamily: Ardeidae

The family Ardeidae contains the bitterns, herons and egrets. Herons and egrets are medium to large wading birds with long necks and legs. Bitterns tend to be shorter necked and more wary. Unlike other long-necked birds such as storks, ibises and spoonbills, members of this family fly with their necks retracted.

 Bittern (Botaurus stellaris)
 Little bittern (Ixobrychus minutus)
 Black-crowned night heron (Nycticorax nycticorax)
 Squacco heron (Ardeola ralloides)
 Cattle egret (Bubulcus ibis)
 Little egret (Egretta garzetta)
 Great white egret (Egretta alba)
 Grey heron (Ardea cinerea)
 Purple heron (Ardea purpurea)

Ibises and spoonbills
Order: CiconiiformesFamily: Threskiornithidae

Threskiornithidae is a family of large terrestrial and wading birds which comprises the ibises and spoonbills. Its members have long, broad wings with 11 primary and about 20 secondary flight feathers. They are strong fliers and, despite their size and weight, very capable soarers.

 Glossy ibis (Plegadis falcinellus)
 Spoonbill (Platalea leucorodia)

Ducks, geese and swans
Order: AnseriformesFamily: Anatidae

Anatidae includes the ducks and most duck-like waterfowl, such as geese and swans. These birds are adapted to an aquatic existence with webbed feet, flattened bills, and feathers that are excellent at shedding water due to an oily coating. There are 131 species worldwide.

 Whooper swan (Cygnus cygnus) Occasional rare wander
 Bean goose (Anser fabalis) Occasional rare wander
 Common shelduck (Tadorna tadorna)
 Ruddy shelduck (Tadorna ferruginea).
 Marbled teal (Marmaronetta angustirostris).
 Eurasian wigeon (Anas penelope)
 Gadwall (Anas strepera)
 Garganey (Anas querquedula)
 Eurasian teal (Anas crecca)
 Mallard (Anas platyrhynchos)
 Northern pintail (Anas acuta)
 Northern shoveler (Anas clypeata)
 Ferruginous duck (Aythya nyroca)
 Tufted duck (Aythya fuligula)
 Red-breasted merganser (Mergus serrator)
 White-headed duck (Oxyura leucocephala)

Storks

Order: CiconiiformesFamily: Ciconiidae

 White stork (Ciconia ciconia); very common
 Black stork (Ciconia nigra)

Tropicbirds
Order: PelecaniformesFamily: Phaethontidae
 Red-billed tropicbird (Phaethon aethereus)

Flamingoes
Order: PhoenicopteriformesFamily: Phoenicopteridae

 Greater flamingo (Phoenicopterus roseus)

Kingfishers
Order: CoraciiformesFamily: Alcedinidae

Kingfishers are medium-sized birds with large heads, long pointed bills, short legs and stubby tails.

 Common kingfisher (Alcedo atthis)
 Smyrna kingfisher/white-breasted kingfisher (Halcyon smyrnesis)

Bee-eaters
Order: CoraciiformesFamily: Meropidae

The bee-eaters are a group of near passerine birds in the family Meropidae. Most species are found in Africa but others occur in southern Europe, southern Asia, Australia and New Guinea. They are characterised by richly coloured plumage, slender bodies and usually elongated central tail feathers. All are colourful and have long down-turned bills and pointed wings, which give them a swallow-like appearance when seen from afar. There are 26 species worldwide.

 Arabian green bee-eater (Merops cyanophrys)
 Blue-cheeked bee-eater (Merops persicus)
 European bee-eater (Merops apiaster)

Typical rollers
Order: CoraciiformesFamily: Coraciidae

Rollers resemble crows in size and build, but are more closely related to the kingfishers and bee-eaters. They share the colourful appearance of those groups with blues and browns predominating. The two inner front toes are connected, but the outer toe is not. There are 12 species worldwide.

 European roller (Coracias garrulus)

Hoopoe
Order: CoraciiformesFamily: Upupidae

Hoopoes have black, white and pink plumage and a large erectile crest on the head. There are two species worldwide.

 Hoopoe (Upupa epops)

Woodpeckers
Order: PiciformesFamily: Picidae

 Syrian woodpecker (Dendrocopos syriacus); common resident.<ref=Safadi2>Al- Safadi, M.M. (2004). On the breeding biology of the Syrian woodpecker, Dendrocopos syriacus syriacus in the Gaza Strip. Zoology in the Middle East. 32: 5-10.</ref>
 Eurasian wryneck (Jynx torquilla)

Thrushes
Order: PasseriformesFamily: Turdidae

 Common blackbird (Turdus merula); common winter visitor (WV) and locally common resident
 Fieldfare (Turdus pilaris); occasional WV
 Mistle thrush (Turdus viscivorus); occasional WV
 Redwing (Turdus iliacus)
 Song thrush (Turdus philomelos); very common WV
 Blue thrush (Monticola solitarius); common WV and locally common resident
 Rock thrush (Monticola saxatilis); uncommon migrant, common in some years

Old World flycatchers

Order: PasseriformesFamily: Muscicapidae
 Arabian wheatear (Oenanthe fins chi); common WV and resident in the south
 Black-eared wheatear (Oenanthe hispanica); very common
 Common wheatear (Oenanthe oenanthe); common migrant
 Desert wheatear (Oenanthe deserti); uncommon resident
 Eastern pied wheatear (Oenanthe pleschanka); once recorded from Rafah
 Hooded wheatear (Oenanthe monacha); rare resident
 Isabelline wheatear (Oenanthe isabellina); common migrant and locally common resident
 Tristram's wheatear (Oenanthe moesta); rare resident
 Mourning wheatear/pied wheatear (Oenanthe lugens); locally common resident
 White rumped wheatear (Oenanthe leucopyga); uncommon resident near Dead Sea
 African stonechat (Saxicola torquata); common WV
 Whinchat (Saxicola rubetra); uncommon migrant
 Black redstart (Phoenicurus ochruros); common WV
 Common redstart (Phoenicurus phoenicurus); common migrant
 Bluethroat (Luscinia svecica svecica); fairly common WV
 Nightingale (Luscinia megarhyncha); migrant (Tristram states that it breeds in Palestine)
 Thrush nightingale/sprosser nightingale (Luscinia luscinia); migrant
 White-spotted bluethroat (Luscinia s. volgae); WV less common
 Robin (Erithacus rubecula); common WV
 Spotted flycatcher (Muscicapa striata)
 Collared flycatcher (Ficedula albicollis)
 European pied flycatcher (Ficedula hypoleuca)
 Red-breasted flycatcher (Ficedula parva)
 Semi-collared flycatcher (Ficedula semitorquata)

Old World warblers

Order: PasseriformesFamily: Sylviidae
 Barred warbler (Sylvia nisoria); rare migrant
 Blackcap (Sylvia atricapilla); common WV, a few remain to breed
 Bowman's warbler (Sylvia melanocephala momus) subspecies of Sardinian warbler; common resident
 Desert warbler (Sylvia nana); only recorded from south end of Dead Sea
 Garden warbler (Sylvia borin); common migrant that Tristram states breeds in Palestine
 Lesser whitethroat (Sylvia curruca); common migrant that perhaps breeds in Palestine
 Menetries's warbler (Sylvia mystacea)
 Orphean warbler (Sylvia hortensis); common migrant and summer visitor (SV)
 Palestine warbler (Sylvia melanothorax); one pair obtained by Tristram near the Dead Sea
 Red Sea warbler (Sylvia leucomelaena)
 Rüppell's warbler (Sylvia ruppeli); uncommon migrant
 Sardinian warbler (Sylvia melanocephala); fairly common resident
 Spectacled warbler (Sylvia conspicillata); fairly common resident
 Subalpine warbler (Sylvia cantillans); uncommon migrant and SV
 Whitethroat (Sylvia communis); common migrant and SV (summer visitor)
 Icterine warbler (Hippolais icterina)
 Olive-tree warbler (Hypolais olivetorum); common migrant and a few remain to breed
 Upcher's warbler (Hypolais languida); common SV in the hills
 Olivaceous warbler (Hypolais pallida); common SV in the plains and Jordan valley
 River warbler (Locustella fluviatilis)
 Savi's warbler (Locustella luscinioides)
 Cetti's warbler (Cettia cetti)
 Clamorous reed warbler (Acrocephalus stentoreus); common SV in Hula marshes
 Reed warbler (Acrocephalus scirpaceus); common migrant
 Great reed warbler (Acrocephalus arundinacea); common SV
 Marsh warbler (Acrocephalus palustris); migrant
 Moustached warbler (Acrocephalus melanopogon)
 Sedge warbler (Acrocephalus schoenobaenus)

Cisticolas and allies
Order: PasseriformesFamily: Cisticolidae
 Fan-tailed warbler (Cisticola cisticola); locally common resident
 Graceful warbler (Prinia gracilis); common resident
 Yellow-browed warbler (Phylloscopus superciliosus); one obtained by Tristram at Jericho in 1864
 Chiffchaff (Phylloscopus collybita); common WV
 Willow warbler (Phylloscopus irochilus); common migrant
 Wood warbler (Phylloscopus sibilatrix); common migrant in the plains
 Bonelli's warbler (Phylloscopus bonellii); common migrant and uncommon SV

Streaked scrub warbler
Order: PasseriformesFamily: Scotocercidae
Streaked scrub warbler (Scotocerca inquieta); uncommon resident

Crows and allies
Order: PasseriformesFamily: Corvidae

The family Corvidae includes crows, ravens, jays, choughs, magpies, treepies, nutcrackers and ground jays. Corvids are above average in size among the Passeriformes, and some of the larger species show high levels of intelligence.

 Brown-necked raven (Corvus ruficollis)
 Common raven (Corvus corax)
 Fan-tailed raven (Corvus rhipidurus)
 Hooded crow (Corvus cornix)
 House crow (Corvus splendens)
 Jackdaw (Corvus monedula)

Starlings
Order: PasseriformesFamily: Sturnidae

Starlings are small to medium-sized passerine birds. Their flight is strong and direct and they are very gregarious. Their preferred habitat is fairly open country. They eat insects and fruit. Plumage is typically dark with a metallic sheen.

 European starling (Sturnus vulgaris)
 Rosy starling (Pastor roseus)
 Tristram's starling/Tristram's grackle (Onychognathus tristramii)

Larks
Order: PasseriformesFamily: Alaudidae

Larks are small terrestrial birds with often extravagant songs and display flights. Most larks are fairly dull in appearance. Their food is insects and seeds.

 Thick-billed lark (Ramphocoris clotbey)
 Bimaculated lark (Melanocorypha bimaculata)
 Calandra lark (Melanocorypha calandra)
 Lesser short-toed lark (Alaudala rufescens)
 Greater short-toed lark (Calandrella brachydactyla)
 Crested lark (Galerida cristata)
 Woodlark (Lullula arborea)
 Eurasian skylark (Alauda arvensis)
 Oriental skylark (Alauda gulgula)
 Temminck's horned lark (Eremophila bilopha)
 Desert lark (Ammomanes deserti)

Swallows and martins
Order: PasseriformesFamily: Hirundinidae

The family Hirundinidae is adapted to aerial feeding. They have a slender streamlined body, long pointed wings and a short bill with a wide gape. The feet are adapted to perching rather than walking, and the front toes are partially joined at the base. There are 75 species worldwide.

 Common house martin (Delichon urbica)
 Sand martin (Riparia riparia)
 Crag martin (Ptyonoprogne rupestris)
 Rock martin (Ptyonoprogne fuligula)
 Barn swallow (Hirundo rustica) and the sub-species Egyptian barn swallow (Hirundo rustica savignii)
 Red-rumped swallow (Hirundo daurica)

Shrikes
Order: PasseriformesFamily: Laniidae

Shrikes are passerine birds known for the habit of some species of catching other birds and small animals and impaling the uneaten portions of their bodies on thorns. A typical shrike's beak is hooked, like a bird of prey.

 Isabelline shrike (Lanius isabellinus)
 Great grey shrike (Lanius excubitor)
 Lesser grey shrike (Lanius minor)
 Masked shrike (Lanius nubicus)
 Red-backed shrike (Lanius collurio)
 Woodchat shrike (Lanius senator)

Finches
Order: PasseriformesFamily: Fringillidae

Finches are passerine birds known for their stout conical bills adapted for eating seeds and which often have colourful plumage. Some finches, particularly, the goldfinch, are known for their pleasant to cacophonous song, which changes in pitch and in tone, from trills into twitters.

 European goldfinch (Carduelis carduelis)

Bulbuls
Order: PasseriformesFamily: Pycnonotidae

Bulbuls are renowned for their melodious tunes, hence its name in Arabic: (بلبل), meaning nightingale.

 White-spectacled bulbul (Pycnonotus xanthopygos)

Avocets and stilts
Order: CharadriiformesFamily: Recurvirostridae

Recurvirostridae is a family of large wading birds, which includes the avocets and stilts. The avocets have long legs and long up-curved bills. The stilts have extremely long legs and long, thin, straight bills. There are nine species worldwide

 Pied avocet (Recurvrostra avosetta)
 Black-winged stilt (Himantopus himantopus)

Thick-knees
Order: CharadriiformesFamily: Burhinidae

The thick-knees are a group of largely tropical waders in the family Burhinidae. They are found worldwide within the tropical zone, with some species also breeding in temperate Europe and Australia. They are medium to large waders with strong black or yellow-black bills, large yellow eyes and cryptic plumage. Despite being classed as waders, most species have a preference for arid or semi-arid habitats. There are nine species worldwide.

 Stone curlew (Burhinus oedicnemus)

Oystercatchers
Order: CharadriiformesFamily: Haematopodidae

 Eurasian oystercatcher (Haematopus ostralegus)

Plovers and lapwings
Order: CharadriiformesFamily: Charadriidae

 Little ringed plover (Charadrius dubius)
 Ringed plover (Charadrius hiaticula)
 Kentish plover (Charadrius alexandrinus)
 Caspian plover (Charadrius asiaticus)
 Spur-winged plover (Vanellus spinosus)
 White-tailed plover (Vanellus leucurus)
 Northern lapwing (Vanellus vanellus)
 Sociable lapwing (Vanellus gregarius)
 Pacific golden plover (Pluvialis fulva)
 Eurasian golden plover (Pluvialis apricaria)
 Grey plover (Pluvialis squatarola

Pratincoles and coursers
Order: CharadriiformesFamily: Glareolidae

Glareolidae is a family of wading birds comprising the pratincoles, which have short legs, long pointed wings and long forked tails, and the coursers, which have long legs, short wings and long pointed bills which curve downwards.

 Cream-coloured courser (Cursorius cursor)
 Collared pratincole (Glareola pratincola)
 Black-winged pratincole (Glareola nordmanni)

Gulls
Order: CharadriiformesFamily: Laridae

Laridae is a family of medium to large seabirds, the gulls and kittiwakes. They are typically grey or white, often with black markings on the head or wings. They have stout, longish bills and webbed feet.

 Black-headed gull (Larus ridibundus)
 Great black-headed gull (Larus ichthyaetus)
 Baltic gull/lesser black-headed gull (Larus fuscus)
 White-eyed gull (Larus leucophthalmus)
 Armenian gull (Larus armenicus)

Skuas
Order: CharadriiformesFamily: Stercorariidae

The family Stercorariidae are, in general, medium to large birds, typically with grey or brown plumage, often with white markings on the wings. They nest on the ground in temperate and arctic regions and are long-distance migrants. There are seven species worldwide.

 Pomarine skua (Stercorarius pomarinus)

Terns
Order: CharadriiformesFamily: Sternidae

Terns are a group of generally medium to large seabirds typically with grey or white plumage, often with black markings on the head. Most terns hunt fish by diving but some pick insects off the surface of fresh water. Terns are generally long-lived birds, with several species known to live in excess of 30 years.

 Gull-billed tern (Gelochelidon nilotica)
 Common tern (Sterna hirundo)
 Little tern (Sterna albifrons)
 Whiskered tern (Chlidonias hybridus)
 White-winged tern/white–winged black tern (Chlidonias leucopterus)

Sandpipers and allies
Order: CharadriiformesFamily: Scolopacidae

Scolopacidae is a large diverse family of small to medium-sized shorebirds including the sandpipers, curlews, godwits, shanks, tattlers, woodcocks, snipes, dowitchers and phalaropes. The majority of these species eat small invertebrates picked out of the mud or soil. Variation in length of legs and bills enables multiple species to feed in the same habitat, particularly on the coast, without direct competition for food.

 Little stint (Calidris minuta)
 Temminck's stint (Calidris temminckii)
 Curlew sandpiper (Calidris ferruginea)
 Dunlin (Calidris alpina)
 Ruff (Philomachus pugnax)
 Jack snipe (Lymnocryptes minimus)
 Snipe (Gallinago gallinago)
 Eurasian curlew (Numenius arquata)
 Whimbrel (Numenius phaeopus)
 Spotted redshank (Tringa erythropus)
 Redshank (Tringa totanus)
 Greenshank (Tringa nebularia)
 Green sandpiper (Tringa ochropus)
 Wood sandpiper (Tringa glareola)
 Common sandpiper (Tringa hypoleucos)
 Sanderling (Calidris alba)
 Black-tailed godwit (Limosa limosa)
 Bar-tailed godwit (Limosa lapponica)
 Terek sandpiper (Xenus cinereus)
 Turnstone (Arenaria interpres)

Pigeons and doves
Order: ColumbiformesFamily: Columbidae

Pigeons and doves are stout-bodied birds with short necks and short slender bills with a fleshy cere.

 Rock dove (Columba livia) and sub species Columba livia schimperi
 Stock dove (Columba oenas)
 Wood pigeon (Columba palumbus)
 Eurasian collared dove (Streptopelia decaocto)
 European turtle dove (Streptopelia turtur)
 Oriental turtle dove (Streptopelia orientalis)
 Laughing dove (Spilopelia senegalensis)
 Namaqua dove (Oena capensis)
 African collared dove (Streptopelia roseogrisea)
 Barbary dove (Streptopelia risoria)

Cuckoos
Order: CuculiformesFamily: Cuculidae

The family Cuculidae includes cuckoos, roadrunners and anis. These birds are of variable size with slender bodies, long tails and strong legs. Many Old World cuckoo species are brood parasites.

 Great spotted cuckoo (Clamator glandarius)
 Cuckoo (Cuculus canorus)

Sandgrouse
Order: PterocliformesFamily: Pteroclidae

 Crowned sandgrouse (Pterocles coronatus)
 Black-bellied sandgrouse (Pterocles orientalis)

Barn owls
Order: StrigiformesFamily: Tytonidae

Barn owls are medium to large owls with large heads and characteristic heart-shaped faces. They have long strong legs with powerful talons. There are 16 species worldwide.

 Barn owl (Tyto alba)

Typical owls
Order: StrigiformesFamily: Strigidae

The typical owls are small to large solitary nocturnal birds of prey. They have large forward-facing eyes and ears, a hawk-like beak and a conspicuous circle of feathers around each eye called a facial disk. There are 195 species worldwide.

 Brown fish-owl (Bubo zeylonensis semenowi)
 Eagle owl (Bubo bubo)
 Pharaoh eagle-owl (Bubo ascalaphus); resident in the southern desert.
 Striated scops owl (Otus brucei)
 Scops owl (Otus scops)
 Little owl (Athene noctua)
 Long-eared owl (Asio otus)
 Short-eared owl (Asio flammeus)

Nightjars
Order: CaprimulgiformesFamily: Caprimulgidae

Nightjars are medium-sized ground-nesting nocturnal birds with long wings, short legs and very short bills. Most have small feet, of little use for walking, and long pointed wings. Their soft plumage is camouflaged to resemble bark or leaves. There are 86 species worldwide.

 European nightjar (Caprimulgus europaeus) common migrant.
 Nubian nightjar (Caprimulgus nubicus)
 Red-necked nightjar (Caprimulgus ruficollis); once recorded from Jerusalem.

Swifts
Order: CaprimulgiformesFamily: Apodidae

Swifts are small birds which spend the majority of their lives flying. These birds have very short legs and never settle voluntarily on the ground, perching instead only on vertical surfaces. Many swifts have long swept-back wings which resemble a crescent or boomerang. There are 98 species worldwide.

 Alpine swift (Apus melba)
 Common swift (Apus apus)
 Little swift (Apus affinis)
 Pallid swift (Apus pallidus)

Other
 Hedge sparrow (Prunella modularis); fairly common WV
 Palestine sunbird (Cinnyris oseus)
 Yellow wagtail (Motacilla flava)

References

 قائمة ببعض الطيور في فلسطين
 صور الطيور في فلسطين
 التجمع الدولي لعلم الطيور - Canaryfans.com

Bibliography

External links
 Bird Life in the Valley by the Brighton Tubas Friendship and Solidarity Group
 Bird links to the world: Palestine by BirdLife International
 Bird Migration Festival by Visit Palestine: Your Guide to Palestine
 Bird ringing by the Palestine Wildlife Society

Palestine
Palestine
Birds